Lock E. Houston (1814 - January 22, 1897) was a judge and state legislator in Mississippi. He served as Speaker of the Mississippi House of Representatives. He served in the Mississippi House during the American Civil War.

He was born in Knox County, Tennessee. His parents died while he was young, he took up blacksmithing to fund his education, graduated from the University of Tennessee, taught in Alabama, studied law, and then settled in Aberdeen, Mississippi.

In 1850 he argued a case before the Mississippi Supreme Court.

In his later life he declined appointment offers to the Mississippi Supreme Court and for nomination as a candidate for a seat in the U.S. Congress.

References

People from Knox County, Tennessee

1814 births
1897 deaths
Speakers of the Mississippi House of Representatives
People from Aberdeen, Mississippi
American blacksmiths
People of Mississippi in the American Civil War
19th-century American educators
Schoolteachers from Alabama
University of Tennessee alumni
Members of the Mississippi House of Representatives
19th-century American politicians
19th-century American lawyers